Javornice is a municipality and village in Rychnov nad Kněžnou District in the Hradec Králové Region of the Czech Republic. It has about 1,100 inhabitants.

Administrative parts
Villages of Jaroslav and Přím are administrative parts of Javornice.

References

External links

Villages in Rychnov nad Kněžnou District